Lewis Drug is an American, Sioux Falls, South Dakota based operator of 45 drugstores under the Lewis Drug and the Lewis Family Drug banners in South Dakota, Minnesota and Iowa.

History 
Headquartered in Sioux Falls, the company was established in 1942 by partners Jesse Lewis and George Fredrickson. John Griffin joined the business shortly after that and bought out Jesse Lewis in 1946. It was established in 1942 as the first self-service drug store in South Dakota and the surrounding region. Griffin's son Mark became the sole owner in 1984.

References 

Companies based in Sioux Falls, South Dakota
Retail companies established in 1942
Pharmacies of the United States
Health care companies based in South Dakota
1942 establishments in South Dakota